Crown Castle is a real estate investment trust and provider of shared communications infrastructure in the United States. Its network includes over 40,000 cell towers approximately 85,000 route miles of fiber supporting small cells and fiber solutions.

Headquartered in Houston, Texas, the company has 100 offices nationwide. In 2017, Crown Castle was ranked on Houston Business Journal's Best Places to Work.

History
On August 31, 2004, Crown Castle completed the sale of its UK subsidiary, Crown Castle UK, to National Grid Transco plc for over $2 billion. National Grid Transco plc was renamed to National Grid plc in July 2005, while Crown Castle UK was renamed National Grid Wireless in October 2005.

On January 12, 2007, Crown Castle completed the acquisition of Global Signal Inc., another U.S. tower operator which was based in Sarasota, Florida.

On December 11, 2011, Crown Castle announced an agreement to purchase NextG Networks, Inc. for nearly $1 billion. NextG had over 7,000 distributed antenna system nodes on-air at the time of the agreement with another 1,500 nodes under construction as well as rights to more than 4,600 miles of fiber optic cables.

On September 28, 2012, Crown Castle entered a tower leasing agreement with T-Mobile US. The deal leases 7,200 wireless towers to the company for a term of 28 years in exchange for $2.4 billion. After the deal ends in 2040, Crown Castle will have an opportunity to purchase the towers for an additional $2.4 billion. Similarly, on October 20, 2013, Crown Castle entered a tower leasing agreement with AT&T Mobility. The deal leases 9,700 wireless towers to the company for a term of 28 years in exchange for $4.85 billion. Crown Castle also gained the right to acquire the towers outright in the future for $4.2 billion. 600 towers will be acquired outright by Crown Castle in the future. AT&T will pay $1,900 a month per site to access the towers with rent rising approximately 2% per year.

In 2015, Crown Castle expanded into small cell technology in order to boost the capability and widen the scope of its network. The acquisition of Quanta Fiber Networks (Sunesys) in 2015 gave the company access to over 10,000 miles of fiber in various metro areas like Los Angeles, Chicago, Silicon Valley and Atlanta. Prior to that, in 2014, the company acquired the 24/7 Mid-Atlantic Network with over 800 miles of fiber along the East Coast of U.S.

On July 19, 2017, Crown Castle signed an agreement to acquire Lightower, a fiber network operator in the northeast U.S., for approximately $7.1 billion. The transaction increased Crown Castle's fiber network to approximately 60,000 route miles. The buyout had a significant impact on second-quarter earnings reported in late July. Revenue increased by 3.3% and small cells increased sales by 42%. Crown Castle also announced a $3.25 billion common stock offering as well as a $1.5 billion sale of convertible preferred shares to help finance the Lightower purchase.

Based on its 2019 revenue, in 2020 Crown Castle joined the Fortune 500 list for the first time, at number 496.

References

External links 
 

Telecommunications companies established in 1994
Real estate companies established in 1994
American companies established in 1994
1994 establishments in Texas
Companies listed on the New York Stock Exchange
Telecommunications companies of the United States
Companies based in Houston
Real estate investment trusts of the United States